Head of the Bight (also called Head of Bight) is a bay located in South Australia at the most northern extent of the Great Australian Bight.

Flora and fauna

Southern right whale
It is one of two locations on Australia's south coast where southern right whales come to calve during their winter migration, the other being located off of Point Anne in Western Australia's Fitzgerald River National Park.

Protected area status
The waters within the Head of the Bight are located within the Far West Coast Marine Park. The land around Head of the Bight is part of Yalata Indigenous Protected Area.

See also
Whale watching in Australia

Notes

External links
Whale Watching At Head Of Bight, official government tourism site

Bays of South Australia
Coastline of South Australia
Great Australian Bight